The 1961 Pittsburgh Panthers football team represented the University of Pittsburgh in the 1961 NCAA University Division football season.  The team compiled a 3–7 record under head coach John Michelosen. The team's statistical leaders included Jim Traficant with 437 passing yards and Rick Leeson with 452 rushing yards.

Schedule

References

Pittsburgh
Pittsburgh Panthers football seasons
Pittsburgh Panthers football